is a song by Japanese rock band Radwimps. It was used as one of the four theme songs to the animated film Your Name, and was one of 26 songs the band composed for the film's soundtrack. It reached number-one on the Billboard Japan Hot 100. It also received a digital download song certification of Million from the Recording Industry Association of Japan for sales of 1,000,000.

Background 
In late 2014, Makoto Shinkai sent the band's frontman, Yojiro Noda a first draft of the film's band. Within a few months, Radwimps submitted a demo of the track alongside "Sparkle". In the context of the film, the song is played during a quick montage in which main characters Taki and Mitsuha swap bodies.

Release 
The song was originally released as a promotional single for the Your Name soundtrack on July 25, 2016, ahead of the Your Name soundtrack's late August release. The original version of the song, which has slight structural changes, was included on the band's eighth studio album Ningen Kaika (along with another of the four vocal compositions from the Your Name soundtrack, "Sparkle"). The song was also used in multiple trailers for Your Name prior to the film's release.

On August 19, 2016, the song's official video premiered on TV Asahi's Music Station. Shortly afterwards, the video was uploaded onto YouTube. Ahead of the film's April 2017 release in North America, Radwimps re-recorded the four vocal theme songs from the film in English, including "Zenzenzense". The English version was unveiled on Tokyo FM's School of Lock! radio program on January 23, 2017, and was released digitally on January 27.

Credits and personnel
Adapted from Your Name liner notes.
Yojiro Noda – composer, lyricist, arranger, producer, vocals, guitar, piano
Akira Kuwahara – producer, guitar
Yusuke Takeda – producer, bass
Mizuki Mori – drums support
Masayoshi Sugai – recording engineer, mixing engineer 
Tom Lord-Alge – mixing engineer
Bob Ludwig – mastering engineer
Tetsuro Sawamoto – assistant engineer
Jamil Kazmi – mix coordination

Charts and sales

Weekly charts

Yearly charts

Certifications and Sales

!scope="row"| South Korea (Gaon)
|N/A
|205,497
|-

Release history

References

External links

Radwimps songs
Songs written by Yojiro Noda
2016 songs
Anime songs
Japanese-language songs
Japanese film songs
Billboard Japan Hot 100 number-one singles
Songs written for animated films